MTV Girls on Top is an Indian Hindi Romance television series. It premiered on 7 March 2016. It was broadcast on MTV India and produced by BBC Worldwide Productions, airing Monday to Thursday nights. The final episode was broadcast on 29 September 2016.

The series highlighted challenges and issues women face in India. The three leading women navigate careers, love, and their responsibilities.

Plot
The show follows the lives of three young women living together in Mumbai as they look to further their careers: Isha (a young TV producer), Gia (an aspiring broadcast journalist), and Revati (a DJ hoping to win an international DJ competition in Amsterdam). It showcases the various challenges they face while trying to elevate their careers, including their love lives, responsibilities and friendship.

Cast
 Saloni Chopra as Isha Jaisingh
 Barkha Singh as Gia Sen
 Ayesha Adlakha as Revati Chauhan
 Ritwika Gupta as YouTuber Shalini who advises Isha
 Shantanu Maheshwari as Sahir Bhasin
 Yuvraj Thakur as Azhar Khan
 Arjun Singh as Guruvinder Singh
 Sana Sayyad as Megha
 Shruti Bapna as Diana (Gia's Boss)
 Shweta Padda as Marium Khan (Azhar's Mom)
 Krissann Barretto as Tapasya
 Macedon Dmello as Rossy
 Pranav Misshra as Shekhar
Sneha Gupta as Mithali
Priyanka Soni as Vrushali

References

External links
 

2016 Indian television series debuts
Hindi-language television shows
Television shows set in Mumbai
MTV (Indian TV channel) original programming
2016 Indian television series endings
Indian teen drama television series